was a French-born Japanese actress and nightclub entertainer.

Early life
Tani was born in Paris. Her birth name was Itani Yōko (猪谷洋子).  She has occasionally been described as 'Eurasian', 'half French', 'half Japanese' and even, in one source, 'Italian Japanese', all of which are incorrect.

French records (1958) show that her father and mother—both Japanese—were attached to the Japanese embassy in Paris, with Tani herself conceived en route during a shipboard passage from Japan to Europe in 1927 and subsequently born in Paris the following year, hence given the name Yōko (洋子), one reading of which can mean "ocean-child.".  Tani would later play a diplomat's daughter in Piccadilly Third Stop.

According to Japanese sources, the family returned to Japan in 1930, when Yoko would still have been a toddler, and she did not return to France until 1950 when her schooling was completed. Given that there were severe restrictions on Japanese travelling outside Japan directly after World War II, this would have been an unusual event; however, it is known that Itani had attended an elite girls' school in Tokyo (Tokyo Women's Higher Normal School, currently Ochanomizu University Senior High School), and then graduated from Tsuda University. She subsequently secured a Catholic scholarship to study aesthetics at the University of Paris (Sorbonne) under Étienne Souriau.

Career

Return to France (1950–1955)
Once back in Paris, Tani found little interest in attending university (although by her own account she persevered for two years despite understanding hardly anything that was being said). Instead, she developed a more compelling attraction to the cabaret, the nightclub, and the variety music-hall, where, setting herself up as an exotic oriental beauty, she quickly established a reputation for her provocative "geisha" dances, which generally ended with her slipping out of her kimono. It was here she was spotted by Marcel Carné, who took her into his circle of director and actor-friends, including Roland Lesaffre, whom she was later to marry. As a result, she began to get bit parts in films—starting as (perhaps predictably) a Japanese dancer, in Gréville's Le port du désir (1953–1954, released 1955)—and on the stage, with a role as  Lotus Bleu   in   la Petite Maison de Thé  (French adaptation of The Teahouse of the August Moon) at the Théâtre Montparnasse, 1954–1955 season.

Lesaffre and Japan (1956)
Tani's involvement with cinema was, up to the mid-1950s, limited entirely to that of portraying stereotyped orientals in French films. With the end of the US occupation of Japan in 1952, however, postwar Japanese cinema itself burst upon the French scene, culminating in the years 1955 and 1956 when a total of six Japanese films, including Akira Kurosawa's Ikimono no Kiroku (I Live in Fear 生きものの記録), were entered at Cannes. It was at Cannes that Tani first made contact with Kurosawa, and the director Hisamatsu Seiji, contacts which led to a trip to Japan in 1956 by Tani and Lesaffre and their joint appearance in the Toho production  Hadashi no seishun (裸足の青春 fr. La jeunesse aux pieds nus), a film about the difficult lives of Catholics in the remote islands off Kyushu, in southern Japan. Tani played the part of a 'fallen woman' who has returned to the islands from Tokyo (where she had run off to become a stripper), and Lesaffre that of the local bishop.  It was originally intended that the film be directed by Kurosawa himself, but in the end it fell to his Toho stable-mate Taniguchi Senkichi.   Tani and Lesaffre's ambition was to bring the film back to France and release it in the French market, an aim which was, however, never achieved.

During the same trip, and also for Toho, Tani took a minor role in Hisamatsu's Jōshû to tomo ni (女囚と共に), a variant on the dubious but ever-popular "women in prison" theme, in which she played a westernised Japanese Catholic named Marie. This film was notable only in that it starred two veritable legends of the Japanese cinema: Hara Setsuko and Tanaka Kinuyo.

International period (1957–1962)
Early in 1957, Tani appeared in a small role in her first English-language film: the MGM production of Graham Greene's The Quiet American, a political drama set in French Indochina. Despite being an American production, the film was shot entirely in Rome (with location scenes of Saigon added), with Tani cast as a francophone Vietnamese nightclub hostess.

But Tani's real "break" in English-language cinema came with the 1958 production The Wind Cannot Read. This film, a war-time love story, had originally been a project of the British producer Alexander Korda, and was to have been directed by David Lean, who in 1955 travelled to Japan with author Richard Mason and cast Japanese actress Kishi Keiko as the female lead. Locations were scouted in India, and Ms Kishi (then 22 years old) was brought to England to learn sufficient English for the part. At a very advanced stage, the project fell apart, and a few months later Korda died. The pieces were eventually picked up by the Rank Organisation, and it was decided to produce the film using the script and locations already set out by Lean, with one of Rank's big stars, Dirk Bogarde, in the male lead, Ralph Thomas to direct, and Tani, who was found in Paris, to play the leading female role. The film was a commercial success and one of the top British films of that year, and led to further roles in other British co-productions --- as the Inuit Asiak in the Anglo-French-Italian The Savage Innocents (Les Dents du diable) (1959 - nominated for the Palme d'Or at Cannes in 1960), and as the ingénue Seraphina in Piccadilly Third Stop (1960).

Aside from The Quiet American, her only other "Hollywood" roles were in My Geisha (1962, shot on location in Japan) and the Dean Martin comedy Who's Been Sleeping in My Bed? (1963, Paramount Studios Los Angeles).

Despite being type-cast as an exotic, Tani got to play some unusual roles as a result, as evidenced by her portrayal of Japanese doctor/scientist Sumiko Ogimura in the self-consciously internationalist 1959 East-German/Polish film production of Stanisław Lem's novel The Astronauts, Der schweigende Stern (First Spaceship on Venus), and as Miyake Hanako, Japanese common-law wife of the German double-agent Richard Sorge in Veit Harlan's .

Perhaps even more unusual (for the time) was her trip to Vancouver, Canada in 1962 to play the role of Mary Ota in James Clavell's The Sweet and the Bitter, which treats the aftermath of the wartime internment of Canadian Japanese and the loss of their properties and businesses. Ota, a young Japanese woman, returns to British Columbia after a twenty-year absence to avenge her father's internment-camp death, her hatred directed towards the man who stole her father's fishing boats.  The film was completed in 1963, but there was no North American release due to legal and financial difficulties. British Lion finally underwrote a showing of the film in London in 1967.

Spies, swords and sandals (1963 onwards)

1962/63 marked a shift in Tani's career: a return (once again) to France and the definitive end of her marriage to Lesaffre. From this point on she was to be more strictly European-based and to take on work mainly in the low-budget Italian peplum cinema and in femme fatale roles in UK television dramas such as Danger Man and Man in a Suitcase.

Despite her involvement with film, Tani never abandoned her attachment to the nightclub and cabaret. The British producer Betty Box, when looking for the female lead for The Wind Cannot Read (vide supra), wrote:

And, from a 1960s account of the well-known Le Crazy Horse de Paris nightclub:

Even as late as 1977, we find her in São Paulo, where she had a small role in Chinese-Brazilian director Juan Bajon's sexploitation film O Estripador de Mulheres:

Ho Ai Li, Assistant Life Editor of 'The Straits Times', (18/10/'15), quotes Tani as saying, when she was in Singapore, to film 'Goldsnake':

Personal life
Tani's 1956 marriage to Roland Lesaffre was childless, and ended in divorce in 1962. Lesaffre claimed in his autobiography Mataf (éditions Pygmalion, 1991), that theirs was the first Franco-Japanese marriage after World War II --- conceivably true, but almost impossible to verify. (True or not, it may have begun something of a trend, since Kishi Keiko and Yves Ciampi were married the following year.)

In later life Tani remarried, wedding Roger Laforet, a native of Binic, Côtes-d'Armor (Brittany). A wealthy industrialist, Laforet was an associate of Baron Marcel Bich, co-founder of the BIC consumer products empire. Tani's declining years were spent between Paris and their house in Paimpol overlooking the sea.

She died in Paris, from cancer, but is buried in Binic together with Laforet. Their tomb carries the Breton inscription «Ganeoc'h Bepred» (roughly, "Always With  You").

Tani was survived by her younger sister, Aiko.

In popular culture

Her first name inspired the Belgian comics character Yoko Tsuno by Roger Leloup.

Film
 1954 (France) : Le port du désir dir. Edmond T. Gréville - unnamed dancer
 1954 (France) : Les Clandestines dir. Raoul André - unnamed Chinese girl
 1954 (France) : Ali Baba et les Quarante voleurs dir. Jacques Becker
 1954 (France) : Marchandes d'illusions dir. Raoul André - unnamed Eurasian
 1954 (France) : The Babes Make the Law dir. Raoul André - The Lotus Flower
 1954 (West Germany) :  dir. Veit Harlan - Hanako (Sorge's Japanese common-law wife)
 1955 (France) : The Price of Love dir. Maurice de Canonge - unnamed dancer
 1955 (France) : Gueule d'ange dir. Marcel Blistène - Bamboo Flower
 1955 (France) : Paris canaille dir. Pierre Gaspard-Huit, released 1956 - unnamed student
 1955 (France) : À la manière de Sherlock Holmes dir. Henri Lepage
 1956 (Japan) : 裸足の青春 - Hadashi no seishun / Barefoot Youth dir. 谷口千吉 / Senkichi Taniguchi - Okano Mariko (岡野マリ子)
 1956 (Japan) : 女囚と共に - Jōshû to tomo ni / Women in Prison dir. 久松静児 / Seiji Hisamatsu - Marie (マリー), a prisoner
 1956 (France) : Mannequins of Paris dir. André Hunebelle - Lotus
 1957 (France) : The Ostrich Has Two Eggs dir. Denys de La Patellière - la comtesse Yoko
 1957 (France) : La Fille de feu dir. Alfred Rode - Zélie
 1958 (Italy) : The Quiet American dir. Joseph L. Mankiewicz - head nightclub hostess
 1958 (UK) : The Wind Cannot Read dir. Ralph Thomas - Aiko Suzuki (Sabby)
 1959 (East Germany/Poland) : Der schweigende Stern/Milcząca Gwiazda - The Silent Star/First Spaceship on Venus dir. Kurt Maetzig & Hieronim Przybył - Sumiko Ogimura MD
 1959 (France/Italy/UK) : The Savage Innocents dir. Nicholas Ray - Asiak
 1960 (UK) : Piccadilly Third Stop dir. Wolf Rilla - Seraphina Yokami
 1961 (Italy/France) : Ursus and the Tartar Princess  dir. Remigio Del Grosso - Princess Ila
 1961 (Italy) : Maciste alla corte del Gran Khan - Samson and the Seven Miracles of the World dir. Riccardo Freda - Princess Lei Ling
 1961 (Italy/France) : Marco Polo dirs. Hugo Fregonese, Piero Pierotti - Princess Amurroy
 1962 (USA/Japan) : My Geisha dir. Jack Cardiff - Kazumi Ito
 1962 (Canada) : The Sweet and the Bitter, dir. James Clavell, released 1967 - Mary Ota
 1963 (USA) : Who's Been Sleeping in My Bed? dir. Daniel Mann - Isami Hiroti
 1964 (Italy) : F.B.I. - Operazione Baalbek dir. Hugo Fregonese & Giuliano Carnimeo - Asia
 1964 (West Germany) : The Secret of Dr. Mabuse dir. Hugo Fregonese - Mercedès
 1964 (Italy) : Bianco, Rosso, Giallo, Rosa - The Love Factory, dir. Massimo Mida - Yoko
 1965 (Italy/France) : OSS 77 – Operazione fior di loto dir. Bruno Paolinelli
 1965 (Italy) : Agent Z-55, Desperate Mission dir. Roberto Bianchi Montero - Su Ling
 1965 (UK) : Invasion dir. Alan Bridges - Chief of the "Lystrians"
 1966 (Italy) : The Spy Who Loved Flowers dir. Umberto Lenzi - Mei Lang
 1967 (Italy) : Le 7 cinesi d'oro dir. Vincenzo Cascino - La giapponese
 1969 (Spain/Italy) : Goldsnake 'Anonima Killers'  dir. Ferdinando Baldi - Annie Wong
 1977 (Brazil) : O Estripador de Mulheres dir. Juan Bajon
 1978 (France) :  dir. André Hunebelle - Youyou

Television
 1960 (UK) : Chasing the Dragon - BBC television (scriptwriter Colin Morris)
 1961 (UK) : Rashomon - BBC television adaptation dir. Rudolph Cartier - The Wife
 1961 (USA) : Here's Hollywood - NBC Television; season 1, episode 28 (broadcast 26 April 1961) - herself
 1962 (USA) : Ben Casey - season 1, episode 27, "A Pleasant Thing for the Eyes" - Aiko Tanaka
 1963 (UK) : Edgar Wallace Mysteries - episode 31, "The Partner" (based on A Million Dollar Story (1926)) dir. Gerard Glaister - Lin Siyan
 1964 (UK) : Drama '64 - ITV; episode "Miss Hanago" (broadcast 22 November 1964) - Miss Hanago
 1966 (UK) : Armchair Theatre - Associated British Corp. - episode "The Tilted Screen" - Michiko
 1967 (UK) : Danger Man - ITV; season 4, episode 1, "Koroshi" - Ako Nakamura
 1967 (UK) : Danger Man - ITV; season 4, episode 2, "Shinda Shima" - Miho
 1967 (UK) : Man in a Suitcase - ITV; episode 5, "Variation on a Million Bucks pt. 1" - Taiko
 1967 (UK) : Man in a Suitcase - ITV; episode 6, "Variation on a Million Bucks pt. 2" - Taiko
 1968 (France/Canada) : Les Dossiers de l'agence O - episode 10, "L'arrestation du musicien" - Kiku - la stripteaseuse
 1971 (UK) : Shirley's World - ITV; episode 12, "A Girl Like You" (UK transmission date 23 June 1972) - Okiyo
 1972 (France/Québéc) : Le Fils du ciel - ORTF/Télévision de Radio-Canada - Gisèle Lelarge
 1986 (France) : Série rose (erotic anthology) - FR3; episode "Le lotus d'or" dir. Walerian Borowczyk - Madame Lune

Theatre
 1954 (France) : Namouna by Jacques Deval - Théâtre de Paris - Sao-Ming
 1955 (France) : La petite maison de thé adapted by Albert Husson - Théâtre Montparnasse - Lotus Bleu
 1958 (France) : Chérie Noire by François Campaux, Théâtre Michel - Chérie
 1965 (UK) : The Professor by Hal Porter, Royal Court Theatre - Fusehime Ishimoto (housemaid)
 1967 (France) : Une femme à louer by François Campaux, mise en scène Christian Alers, Théâtre de la Potinière

References

1928 births
1999 deaths
Japanese film actresses
French film actresses
French stage actresses
French television actresses
French people of Japanese descent
Actresses from Paris
20th-century French actresses